The German DRG Class 71.0 was a  locomotive with the Deutsche Reichsbahn, which was intended as a replacement for railbuses. Originally it had been planned for these standard engines (Einheitsloks) to haul fast passenger trains.

Two vehicles were delivered in 1934 by the firm of Schwartzkopff and two each in 1936 by the firms of Borsig and Krupp. The two-cylinder superheated engines were equipped with automatic underfeed stokers for one-man operation. In the course of its service the boiler overpressure was reduced from 20 bar to 16 bar for safety reasons. All the locomotives had a plate frame. The second coupled wheelset was driven and the carrying wheels rested in Bissel axles.

The Deutsche Bundesbahn took over all the engines after the Second World War and allocated them to the locomotive depot (Bahnbetriebswerk or Bw) in Nuremberg. Later they were all transferred to Kaiserslautern and Landau. The locomotives were retired by 1956.

No examples of the DRG Class 71.0 remain.

See also
 List of DRG locomotives and railbuses

Reference

External links 
 Locomotive drawing and data

71.0
2-4-2T locomotives
71.0
Krupp locomotives
Railway locomotives introduced in 1934
Borsig locomotives
Berliner locomotives
Passenger locomotives
Scrapped locomotives
Standard gauge locomotives of Germany
1′B1′ h2t locomotives